Line 8 of Jinan Metro is a rapid transit line under construction in Jinan. The line will be 25.5 km in length, including 19.9 km elevated section and 5.6 km underground section. There will be 14 stations. Construction started on September 20, 2022.

References

08